The Canadian Masters Curling Championships are an annual curling tournament featuring Canadian provincial and territorial teams of athletes at the age of 60 years and over. The Across Canada Masters event began in 2000. Several Provinces have held Provincial Masters Championships beginning in the years around 1986. The Canadian Masters Curling Championships featured 10 end games in the years 2000-2006. From 2007, featured a switch to 8 end games and this aspect became and remains part of the standard game length format.

The Year 2010 Canadian Masters in New Brunswick implemented a shift to the double pool play format ( from a single Round Robin format) to qualify 4 teams for the final playoffs medal playoff games. From 2010 until present, 4 teams from each separate pool play and then advance to Championship pool play. This results in qualifying 4 teams for the final playoffs. Of interest is that Canadian Seniors Nationals have since adopted this format for National competition play. 
The 2018 Brier and 2018 Scotties National Championships are planning to follow a format similar to the Masters Model of Pool play and move away from the single Round Robin model of Canadian Championship determination.

Past champions

External links

Curling competitions in Canada